Actaeon  (or Actæon, or Acteon) was launched at Fort Gloster, India, in 1815. She was wrecked without loss of life on 28 October 1822 in the D'Entrecasteaux Channel in southern Tasmania. 

Actaeon was originally owned by J. Scott & Co. of Calcutta. She was then sold at Mauritius.

Loss
Actaeon, under the command of Captain John Mackay, left Mauritius on 6 September 1822 bound for Sydney. She struck the rocks in D'Entrecasteaux Channel around midnight on 28 October and the crew abandoned ship. The officers and some of the crew took the longboat and made for Hobart, where they reported the wreck.  and  went to salvage as much cargo as possible and pick up the remaining crew. Some 300 barrels of pork were salvaged from Actaeons mixed cargo of wine, spirits, coal, pork, soap, and other goods. A gale totally wrecked Actaeon and one of the salvagers was drowned.

Captain John Mackay named the island and reef group where Acteon was wrecked Actaeon Island.

Citations and references
Citations

References
 
  
 

British ships built in India
Shipwrecks of Tasmania
Sail ships of Australia
Individual sailing vessels
Maritime incidents in October 1822
1815 ships